Minkhaung of Mrauk-U (1477–1531) was king of Arakan from 1521 to 1531. He was a son of King Dawlya (r. 1482–1492), and succeeded his elder brother King Thazata. He ascended the throne and married his brother's chief queen, Saw Nan-Hset. He was overthrown and killed by Min Bin, then governor of Sandoway (Thandwe) in 1531.

Notes

References

Bibliography
 

Monarchs of Mrauk-U
1477 births
1531 deaths
16th century in the Mrauk-U Kingdom
16th-century Burmese monarchs